Nurture is the second studio album by American electronic music producer Porter Robinson, released on April 23, 2021. Like his debut album Worlds, Nurture marks a shift in Robinson's musical style, and includes themes of Robinson's personal struggles with depression and his struggle to create and be proud of the music he was writing.

Following the pre-releases of several singles in the album, Nurture was released on April 23, 2021. It debuted on Billboard’s Top Dance/Electronic Albums at number one, marking Robinson's second album to do so, and earned unanimous acclaim from critics and audiences. Nurture made several year-end lists, including Billboard's list of the "Best Albums of 2021" and  Paste magazine's list of the "50 Best Albums of 2021".

Background 
From 2015 to 2017, the years following his debut album, Robinson stated that he struggled to create music that he was proud of due to suffering from bouts of depression.

In 2016, Robinson released "Shelter", a collaboration with friend and fellow electronic producer Madeon. Robinson would later cite Madeon's work with writing and performing his album Good Faith (2019) as a factor in making Nurtures existence possible.

In 2017, Robinson unveiled his Virtual Self project, a eurodance and trance inspired production alias in tandem with a five-track EP. He made it clear that he would not mix music between his name and his alias, and would not play his alias's music while performing under his name (and vice versa).

In January 2020, he announced the album and the first single, "Get Your Wish", from the album to be released the next day. The announcement was made along with a 52-second video that featured cryptic messages and hints, including an obscured Google Maps link, dates, and geographic coordinates. These messages and hints are a signature of Robinson, who frequently hides puzzles and clues in his promotional material, art, and music for his fans to decrypt.

Nurture was originally intended to be released in September 2020. However, during the COVID-19 pandemic, the release was pushed back, and Robinson replaced some songs and extended the length of the album from 11 to 14 songs. On December 18, 2020, the album was submitted, with Robinson announcing that the album's release would be in "a few months". The release date was later announced to be April 23, 2021. On April 12, 2021, he revealed the titles of all of the tracks on the album.

Album title and cover art 
Along with the name Nurture, Robinson had also considered the name Only Hope for the album, though Nurture was more appealing to him. The name Nurture was chosen for its similarity with the word "nature", as Robinson hoped to "give people the feeling of nature", as well as the "nature versus nurture" problem, "to make [people] feel like they can change the way they think of themselves and improve themselves."

The album's cover art shows Robinson lying face-down in a meadow of flowers. Working with Samuel Burgess-Johnson, Robinson did a photoshoot for the cover art in March 2020. During the photoshoot, a large number of options were considered, but Robinson on an impulse dropped face-first into the ground for the last picture, which ultimately became the album's cover art, though Robinson and Burgess-Johnson were initially imagining "a white sky and a perfect Windows XP-style hill with [Robinson] standing there or maybe not [Robinson] standing there." Robinson sees the cover art as reflective of the personal tone in Nurture.

Singles 
The album's lead single, "Get Your Wish", was released on January 29, 2020, for streaming and digital download. A 7" vinyl press of the song was also put on sale on Robinson's website.

The album's second single, "Something Comforting", was released on March 10, 2020. The official music video was released on March 25, 2020. A 7" vinyl press of the song was again put on his website.

The album's third single, "Mirror", was released on August 26, 2020. The official music video was released on September 9, 2020, featuring character designs of Porter Robinson with other effects. A 7" vinyl press of the song was again put on his website along with a limited run of "Mirror Capsule" merchandise.

The album's fourth single "Look at the Sky" was released on January 27, 2021. A 7" vinyl press of the song was again put on his website. Robinson played a sample of the song at the end of his set at his online festival event Secret Sky on May 9, 2020. The music video of the song was released on February 10, 2021.

The album's fifth single, "Musician", was released on March 3, 2021. The song was announced on Robinson's Twitter account on February 26, 2021, with an animated teaser video. The music video was released on March 17, 2021. A 7" vinyl press of the song was again put on his website.

The album's sixth and final single, "Unfold", was released on April 22, 2021, one day before the release of the album. The song is a collaboration between Robinson and Totally Enormous Extinct Dinosaurs.

Live performances 

On April 15, 2021, Robinson announced that Secret Sky 2021, the digital version of his yearly festival Second Sky, would take place on April 24, the day after the release of Nurture. At Secret Sky, Robinson premiered the live show of Nurture. The first in-person renditions were performed in back-to-back performances at his Second Sky Festival on September 18–19, 2021.

On May 10, 2021, Robinson announced the Nurture Live Tour, with support from Jai Wolf. He later announced the addition of more dates and additional support from James Ivy. A European version of the tour was announced in December 2021, becoming his first European headline tour in five years. A 6-stop Asia tour was announced in 2023.

Critical reception 

At Metacritic, Nurture has an aggregate score of 78, indicating "generally favorable reviews".

Sophie Walker from The Line of Best Fit wrote, "While Nurture may feel disordered, it's a kind of chaos that can only come with passion – and that is a sound Porter Robinson has more than earned the right to explore", scoring it a 9/10.

Josh Crowe of Clash magazine, in his 8/10 review, wrote, "The lyrical frenzies, when coupled with competing instrumentation, at times feels perhaps too frantic, but you can't fault the producer's efforts to craft a body of work that carries more substance than clubby touchstones."

Ben Devlin of musicOMH gave the album 4 out of 5 stars, writing that "Nurture is not a perfect record – it's a bit too samey for an hour-long release" but also that Robinson "has developed a niche that is fun, vivid and enthralling."

In his review for Spectrum Culture, Aaron Pasking wrote that "Nurture is honest, consistent and focused, an improvement on Worlds in almost every way. Like any great sophomore album, Nurture sees its creator develop a unique musical personality while holding onto the qualities that made them successful in the first place."

In a review for PopMatters, Chris Conaton wrote "Nurture is maybe a little too long of an album for 2021-level attention spans, but after seven years and a notable case of writer's block, it's understandable that Robinson would want to go big. Not every song here is top-notch, but Robinson's relentless insistence on catchy melodies makes it all quite listenable."

Accolades

Nurture was featured on multiple year-end lists for the best albums of 2021, being ranked as the best album of 2021 by The Fader and Our Culture Mag. Promotional single "Look at the Sky" was ranked on the 2021 best song lists of Billboard, The Fader, and Our Culture, while "Musician" placed on NPR's annual lists of the best electronic music and the best songs.

Commercial performance 
According to MRC Data, Nurture earned 14,000 equivalent album units in its first week. It was Robinson's second number one debut on the Billboard Top Dance/Electronic Albums chart after his previous studio album, Worlds.

Track listing 
All tracks were revealed by Robinson via social media on April 12, 2021. The Japanese edition of the album features an additional 15th track featuring Wednesday Campanella.

Notes
 "Look at the Sky" features guitar from Yvette Young.
 "Wind Tempos" has additional recordings from Masakatsu Takagi.
 "Musician" contains a sample of "Think (About It)", as performed by Lyn Collins, written by James Brown; and "It Takes Two", as performed by Rob Base and DJ E-Z Rock, written by James Brown and Robert Ginyard, as well as a currently unreleased collaborative track between Kero Kero Bonito and Robinson.
All tracks recorded at In-Da-Mix Studios in Montreal, Canada. 
"Look at the Sky", "Get Your Wish" and "Something Comforting" were mastered by Zino Mikorey. "Lifelike", "Wind Tempos", "Musician", "Do-re-mi-fa-so-la-ti-do", "Mother", "Dullscythe", "Sweet Time", "Mirror", "Blossom", "Unfold" and "Trying to Feel Alive" were mastered by Randy Merrill.

Charts

References

2021 albums
Porter Robinson albums
Albums produced by Porter Robinson
Mom + Pop Music albums
Synth-pop albums by American artists
Albums postponed due to the COVID-19 pandemic